The King is the Best Mayor (Italian: Il miglior sindaco, il re, Spanish: El mejor alcalde, el rey) is a 1974 Italian-Spanish historical drama film directed by Rafael Gil and starring Analía Gadé, Simonetta Stefanelli and Ray Lovelock.

The film is based on the play The Best Mayor, The King by Lope de Vega.

Cast
Analía Gadé as Felicia  
Simonetta Stefanelli as Elvira  
Ray Lovelock as Sancho  
Fernando Sancho as Conde  
Andrés Mejuto as The King 
 as Pelayo  
José Nieto as Nuño  
Antonio Casas as Celio  
Tomás Blanco as Alcalde 
Alejandro de Enciso as Julio  
Luis Induni as D. Enrique  
Fernando Sánchez Polack as Yuntero 
Rafael Corés as Obispo

References

External links

Italian historical drama films
1970s historical drama films
Films directed by Rafael Gil
Films set in the 12th century
Italian films based on plays
Films based on works by Lope de Vega
1970s Spanish-language films
Spanish drama films
1970s Spanish films
1970s Italian films